Antonio Pangallo (born 4 February 1990) is an Italian-German footballer who plays as a defender for Türkspor Neu-Ulm.

Career

Pangallo played as a youth for TV Wiblingen, before joining his hometown club, SSV Ulm 1846, in 2000. Eight years later he broke into the first-team, where he made 54 appearances over two and a half years before joining Bayern Munich II in January 2011. He made his 3. Liga debut in a 2–0 defeat against Wacker Burghausen on 22 January 2011. He left Bayern after two and a half seasons and signed for FC Augsburg II shortly afterwards.

Career statistics

References

External links
 
 

1990 births
Living people
German sportspeople of Italian descent
SSV Ulm 1846 players
FC Bayern Munich II players
FC Augsburg players
3. Liga players
Regionalliga players
German footballers
Association football defenders
Sportspeople from Ulm
Footballers from Baden-Württemberg